Tura al Gharbiya is a Palestinian town in the Jenin Governorate in the Northern area of the West Bank, located 14 kilometers  West of Jenin close to the separation barrier. According to the Palestinian Central Bureau of Statistics, the town had a population of over 1,110 inhabitants in mid-year 2006. The healthcare facilities for the surrounding villages are based in Tura al Gharbiya, the facilities are designated as MOH level 1.

History
In the  1945 census, during  the British Mandate era, Khirbat Tura el Gharbiya was counted with  Barta'a, and together they    had a population of 1,000 Muslims  with 20,499  dunams of land, according to an official land and population survey.  464 dunams were used for plantations and irrigable land, 1,957 dunams for cereals, while 1,900 dunams were non-cultivable land.

Jordanian era
In the wake of the 1948 Arab–Israeli War, and after the 1949 Armistice Agreements, Tura al-Gharbiya  came under Jordanian rule.

The Jordanian census of 1961 found 336 inhabitants in Tura Gharbiya.

Post 1967
Since the Six-Day War in 1967, Tura al-Gharbiya has been under Israeli occupation.

References

Bibliography

External links
 Welcome To Kh. Tura al-Gharbiyya
Survey of Western Palestine, Map 8: IAA, Wikimedia commons 
Google map

Jenin Governorate
Villages in the West Bank
Municipalities of the State of Palestine